Lloy James Ball (born February 17, 1972, in Fort Wayne, Indiana) is an American volleyball player, a member of American national team in 1993–2008, a participant of the Olympic Games (Atlanta 1996, Sydney 2000, Athens 2004) and gold medalist of Olympics Beijing 2008, gold medalist of the NORCECA Championship 2007 and World League 2008, silver medalist of the Pan American 1995, bronze medalist of the World Championship 1994 and 2015 inductee to the International Hall of Game. When not on the court actively playing the game, Ball operates Team Pineapple, a volleyball clinic that also features his father, Arnie Ball.

Personal life
Ball grew up in Woodburn, Indiana, where he attended Woodlan High School. Because Ball grew up in a state that did not sanction varsity competition in boys' volleyball, he only played competitively during the summer. He made his first breakthrough at age 15 by getting an automatic position on the 1987 Olympic Festival.  Ball also played basketball.  As a Junior, Ball’s team lost in the Sectional finals to a stellar Bishop Dwenger Saint’s Basketball team.  It was a crushing loss for Ball and was a huge factor in driving him towards his future success.  This Dwenger team consisted of stars like TJ Steele, David Lion, John Sullivan, Tim Burns and Brian Finley.  Ball was recruited by Bobby Knight to play the game at Indiana University. Ball currently resides in Angola, Indiana, with his wife, son and daughter.

IPFW
Ball attended Indiana University – Purdue University Fort Wayne (IPFW) from 1991–1995 and played volleyball there for his father, Arnie Ball. In his freshman season, he was named Volleyball Magazine National Freshman of the Year as he recorded 1,421 assists to go along with 171 digs, 113 blocks and 164 kills on the year. In his sophomore season, he was an American Volleyball Coaches Association (AVCA) Second Team All-American and also broke the school record for single season assists (2,047).

In his junior year, he was repeated as a Second Team All-American and was the Midwestern Intercollegiate Volleyball Association (MIVA) Player of the Year and recorded a career high 106 assists vs. Ball State. He ranked among the top 20 in the nation in hitting percentage and aces per game. In 1994, he was a First Team All-American and repeated as the MIVA Player of the Year. He led IPFW to the NCAA Men's Volleyball Championship semifinals, before suffering a broken hand prior to the match.

In 2006, Ball was inducted into the IPFW Athletics Hall of Fame alongside his father as part of the inaugural class. Following the 2018 dissolution of IPFW and the transfer of its athletic program to the newly created Purdue University Fort Wayne, the institution is now known as the Purdue Fort Wayne Athletics Hall of Fame.

National team

International
Ball competed at the 1991 (silver) and 1993 World University Games. He was also on the national team that won the silver medal at the 1995 Pan American Games. Ball was selected for the USA national team in May 1994 after concluding a stellar collegiate career at IPFW.

Ball represented the U.S. men's volleyball team at the 2007 FIVB Men's World Cup, helping the team to finish fourth. At the 2008 FIVB World League, Ball led the U.S. men to its first ever World League title, by defeating Serbia in the final. Ball was named the "Best Setter" and Most Valuable Player of the tournament.

Olympics
Ball made his Olympic debut at the 1996 Atlanta Olympics, where Team USA finished in ninth place tie with South Korea, after having claimed the bronze medal two years earlier at the World Championships. At the 2000 Sydney Olympics, Ball started but the USA had a disappointing tournament, not winning a match and finishing with an 11th place tie with Egypt.

At the 2004 Athens Olympics, Ball led Team USA to the semifinals, where they lost to eventual gold medalist Brazil. They earned their way to the bronze medal match, but were swept by Russia to come down to a fourth-place finish. Despite not getting a medal, it was the best Olympic finish for the men since they won the bronze medal in 1992.

With his selection to the 2008 Olympic squad, Ball became the first male volleyball player from the United States to compete in four Olympics. After leading Team USA past Russia in 5 sets at the 2008 Summer Olympics semifinals in Beijing, China, Ball led Team USA to the gold medal by defeating World No. 1 Brazil in four sets. During the tournament, the U.S. never lost a match, going undefeated at 8–0.

Professional
With the professional club Iraklis Thessaloniki, he won two silver medals at the 2004–05 and 2005–06 CEV Champions League. In 2004-05 he was also awarded "Best Setter".

With the professional club VC Zenit Kazan he won a gold medal at the 2007–08 CEV Champions League and a third silver medal at the 2010–11 CEV Champions League, along with a second "Best Setter" award. On April 11, 2011, Ball announced he would be retiring at the end of VC Zenit Kazan's season during an interview on The Net Live radio talkshow.

Awards

Individuals
 2010–11 CEV Champions League "Best Setter"
 2008 FIVB World League "Best Setter"'''
 2008 FIVB World League "Most Valuable Player"' 2007 NORCECA Championship "Best Setter" 2007 NORCECA Championship "Most Valuable Player" Inducted into IPFW Athletics Hall of Fame (2006, the inaugural class) 2004–05 CEV Champions League "Best Setter" 2003 NORCECA Championship "Best Setter" 1999 FIVB World Cup "Best Setter"''

Footnotes

References

External links
 
 
 
 

1972 births
Living people
American men's volleyball players
Olympic gold medalists for the United States in volleyball
Volleyball players at the 1996 Summer Olympics
Volleyball players at the 2000 Summer Olympics
Volleyball players at the 2004 Summer Olympics
Volleyball players at the 2008 Summer Olympics
Setters (volleyball)
Sportspeople from Fort Wayne, Indiana
Purdue Fort Wayne Mastodons men's volleyball players
Medalists at the 2008 Summer Olympics
People from Allen County, Indiana
People from Angola, Indiana
Iraklis V.C. players
Pan American Games silver medalists for the United States
Pan American Games medalists in volleyball
Volleyball players from Indiana
Ural Ufa volleyball players
Volleyball players at the 1995 Pan American Games
Medalists at the 1995 Pan American Games